Luís Viana, born Luíz Vianna, (30 November 1846 - 6 July 1920) was a Brazilian politician and magistrate.

References 

1846 births
1920 deaths
Governors of Bahia
Candidates for Vice President of Brazil